Daniel Kwele was a Botswanan politician, and a co-founder of the Botswana National Front, along with Kenneth Koma. He was interred in Francistown, where, on the 50th anniversary of his party's founding, there was a jubilee.

References

Botswana National Front politicians